The office of High Sheriff of Montgomeryshire was established in 1541 since then a High Sheriff was appointed annually until 1974 when the office was transformed into that of High Sheriff of Powys as part of the creation of Powys from the amalgamation of Montgomeryshire, Radnorshire and Brecknockshire. Between the Edwardian Conquest of Wales in 1282 and the establishment of the High Sheriff of Montgomeryshire in 1541 the sheriff's duties were mainly the responsibility of the coroner and the Custos Rotulorum of Montgomeryshire. The Office of High Sheriff remained first in precedence in the County until the reign of Edward VII when an Order in Council in 1908 gave the Lord Lieutenant of Montgomeryshire the prime Office under the Crown as the Sovereign's personal representative.

This is a list of High Sheriffs of Montgomeryshire.

List of Sheriffs

16th century

1541: Humphrey Lloyd of Leighton
1542: Sir Robert Acton
1543: Lewis Jones of Bishop's Castle, Shropshire 
1544: Griffith ap David ap John
1545: Lewis Jones
1546: Reginald Williams, Willaston
1547: William Herbert of Park, Llanwnog
1548: Matthew Price (commonly called Matthew Goch), Newtown
1549: Robert Acton
1550: Sir Robert Acton
1551: James Leche of Newtown
1552: Sir Edward Leighton of Wattlesborough Castle, Salop
1553: Nicholas Purcell, Lord of Talerddig
1554–1555: Richard Powell of Ednop, Mainstone
1556: Henry Acton
1557: Sir Edward Herbert
1558: Lewis Jones of Bishop's Castle, Shropshire  
1559: John Herbert of Cemmaes, Buildwas (1st term)
1560: Thomas Williams of Willaston
1561: Randolph Hanmer
1562: John Price of Eglwysegle, Denbighshire
1563: Andrew Vavasour, of Newtown
1564: George Beynon
1565: Randulph Hanmer / Rees ap Morris ap Owen of Aberbechan
1566: John Price of Newtown
1567: Richard Salwey
1568: Sir Edward Herbert
1569: William Herbert of Park, Llanwrog
1570: Thomas Tanat, Llanyblodwel
1571: Robert Lloyd of Plas-is-Clawdd, Chirk, Denbighshire
1572: Robert Puleston of Havod-y-Wern
1573: John Trevor of Trevalyn
1574: David Lloyd Jenkin of Llanidloes
1575: John Herbert (2nd term)
1576: Richard Herbert of Park, Llanwnog
1577: David Lloyd Blayney of Gregynog, Mont.,
1578: Arthur Price of Vaynor, Berriew
1579: Richard Morris of Rhiwsaeson, Cyfeiliog
1580: Thomas Jukes of Buttington
1581: Griffith Lloyd of Maesmawr
1582: Morgan Gwynn of Llanidloes
1583: John Owen Vaughan of Llwydiarth
1584: Richard Herbert of Park, Llanwnog
1585: David Lloyd Blayney of Tregynon of Gregynog, Mont.,
1586: John Price of Newtown
1587: David Lloyd Jenkin of Llanidloes
1588: Jenkin Lloyd of Perth-lwyd 
1589: William Williams
1590: Morgan Meredith
1591: Sir Richard Pryse, Kt of Gogerddan, Cardiganshire
1592: Sir Edward Leighton of Wattlesborough Castle, Salop
1593: Thomas Lewis of Harpton, Radnor
1594: Reginald Williams of Willaston
1595: Francis Newton of Heightley, Chirbury
1596: William Williams of Cochwillan
1597: Thomas Purcell of Dinthill, Forden
1598: Edward Hussey of Albrighton, Shropshire
1599: Richard Leighton of Gwernygo, Kerry

17th century

1600: Hugh Lloyd of Bettws
1601: Charles Lloyd of Leighton
1602: Thomas Jukes of Buttington
1603: Sir Richard Price of Aber-bechan
1604: William Penrhyn of Rhysnant
1605: Sir Edward Herbert of Montgomery Castle
1606: Jenkin Lloyd of Perth-lwyd
1607: Sir Richard Hussey of Criggion
1608: Charles Herbert of Aston
1609: Rowland Pugh of Mathafarn, Llanwrin
1610: Lewis Gwynn of Llanidloes
1611: Rowland Owen of Llunllo
1612: Morris Owen of Rhiw-saeson
1613: William Herbert of Powis Castle
1614: Edward Price of Kerry
1615: Edward Price of Newtown
1616: Richard Lloyd of Marrington
1617: Sir Edward Fox of Gwern-y-go, Ceri and Caynham and Ludlow, Shropshire
1618: Thomas Kerry of Binweston, Salop
1619: Robert Owen, Woodhouse, Salop
1620: Richard Rocke of Meifod
1621: Thomas Jukes of Buttington
1622: Sir John Pryce of Gogerddan
1623: Edward Kynaston of Hordley, Salop
1624: Sir William Owen of Condover, Salop
1625: Edward Purcell of Nantcribba, Forden
1626: Rowland Pugh of Mathafarn, Llanwrin
1627: Richard Pugh, of Dolycorslwyn, Cemmaes
1628: Evan Glynn of Glynn, Llanidloes
1629: Sir Edward Lloyd of Berthlloyd
1630: John or Lewis Blayney
1631: William Washbourne
1632: James Phillips, of Llanrhaiadr
1633: Sir John Hayward
1634: William Herbert of Meivod / Sir Phillip Eyton of Eyton
1635: Thomas Ireland of Vaynor
1636: Meredith Morgan, of Aberhafesp
1637: Lloyd Piers, of Maesmawr, Guildsfield
1638: John Newton, of Chirbury
1639: Richard Pryce of Gunley (1st term)
1640: Edward Maurice, of Penybont
1641: Roger Kynaston, of Hordley, Salop
1642: Thomas Nicholls, of Boycott, Pontesbury, Salop
1643: John or Lewis Blayney of Tregynon
1644: Sir Arthur Blayney of Gregynog and Castleblayney
1645–1646: No sheriff appointed
1647: Rowland Hunt, of Shrewsbury
1648: Mathew Morgan 
1649: Evan Lloyd, of Llanwnog
1650: Lloyd Piers, of Maesmawr, Guilsfield
1651: Edward Corbet, 1st Baronet (or Ffoulkes?), of Leighton
1652: Richard Pryce of Gunley, Forder (2nd term) 
1653: Richard Owen, of Rhiwsaeson, Llanbrynmair
1654: Hugh Pryce, of Gwernygoe, Kerry
1655: John Kynaston, of Plas Kynaston, Rhiwabon
1656: Thomas Lloyd, of Trwscoed, Guilsfield
1657: Richard Herbert of Parke, Llanwnog
1658: Sir George Devereux of Vaynor
1659–1660: Sir Matthew Pryce of Newtown
1661: Roger Mostyn of Dolycorslwyn, Cemmaes
1662: David Powell of Maesmawr, Llandinam
1663: Watkin Kyffin of Glascoed, Llansilin
1664: Rowland Nicholls of Boycott, Pontesbury, Salop
1665: Sir John Wittewrong, 1st Baronet
12 November 1665: Edward Kynaston, of Hordley
7 November 1666: Arthur Weaver, of Bettws and Morvil, Salop
6 November 1667: Evan Lloyd, of Llanwnog
6 November 1668: Robert Owen, of Woodhouse, Salop
11 November 1669: Sir Charles Lloyd, 1st Baronet
1671: Thomas Ireland, of Vaynor, Berriew
1672: Thomas Lloyd, of Maesmawr, Guilsfield
1673: George Devereux, of Vaynor, Berriew
1674: Richard Mytton of Pontyscowryd
1675: Evan Glynn of Glyn (replaced Lewk Anwel)
1676: David Maurice, of Penybont, Llansilin / George Llewellyn, Shrewsbury
1677: John Kyffin, of Bodfach, Llanfyllin
1678: John Williams, of Ystumcolwyn, Meifod
1679: Sidney Godolphin, of Abertanat, Llanyblodwel
1680: John Thomas (of Llanfair), Llanlloddion, Llanfair Caereinion
1681: Edward Lloyd
1682: Walter Clapton, Clopton, Llandrinio
1683: Edmund Lloyd, Trefnant, Castle Caereinion
1684: John Lloyd (of Llanovan), Glanhafon, Llanrhaeadr-ym-mochnant
1685: David Morris Penybont, of Llansilin
1686: Gabriel Wynne, of Dolarddyn, Castle Caereinion
1687: Leighton
1688: Thomas Mason (of Rockley), Chirbury, Salop
1688 (Jan–Nov): Edward Vaughan of Glan-llyn and Llwydiarth
1689: Capt. Richard (or John) Pryce of Gunley
1689: Richard Stedman (of  Kerry)
1689: Richard Glinn, of Glynn Clywedog, Llanidloes
1689: Edward Lloyd, of Berthlwyd, Llanidloes
1690: Arthur Vaughan, of Tedderwen, Llandrinio
1691: Philip Eyton, of Criggion
1692: Humphrey Kinaston of Bryngwyn, Llanfechain
1693: Richard Owen, of Peniarth, Llanegryn, Merioneth
1694: Humphrey Lloyd
1695: John Read (or Reade)of Llandinam
1696: Thomas Severne of Wallop Hall, Salop, and Rhosgoch
1697: Thomas Fowkes, of Penthryn, Llandrinio
1698: John Cale
1699: Udall Corbett, of Leighton

18th century

1700: Samuel Adderton
1700: William Lewis Amwill of Anwyl, Cemaes and Llanfrothen, Merioneth
1702: John Felton of Oswestry, Salop 
1702: William Merideth, of Forden
1704: Sir William Williams, 2nd Baronet, of Gray's Inn
1704: Henry Biggs, prob. of Benthill, Alberbury, Salop
1705: Adam Price, of Bodfach, Llanfyllin
1706: Sir Charles Lloyd, 3rd Baronet, of Moel-y-Garth, Guilsfield
1707: Richard Lister, of Penrhos, Llandrinio
1708: Vaughan Price, of Newtown
1709: Francis Herbert of Plas Dolguog, Penegoes, near Machynlleth
1710: William Laiton, prob. of Leighton, Wattlesborough, Salop
1711: Arthur Devereux,of  Nantcribbau, Forden
1712: Evan Jones, of Llanlloddion, Llanfair Caereinion
1712: Jenkin Lloyd, of Clochfaen, Llangurig
1713: Thomas Owen (of Lang Michele), Nantymeichiaid, Meifod 
1714: John Blayney of Gregynog, Tregynon
1715: John Scott
1716: Thomas Lloyd, Glanhafon, Llanrhaeadr-y-Mochnant
1717: John Herbert (of Kerry), Cwmyddalfa
1718: Francis Evans, Cynhinfa, Llangynyw
1718: John Evans (son of preceding Sheriff)
1719: Brockwell Griffiths, of Bronyarth, Guilsfield
1720: Edward Lloyd, of Aberbechan, Llanllwchaiarn
1721: John Scot, of Salop
1721: Walter Wareing, of Owlbury, Bishops Castle, Salop
1722: George Ambler of Buttington
1722: Charles Bright, Pentre, Aston, Churchstoke
1722: Robert Phillips, Salop
1723: John Bright, of Pentre, Aston, Churchstoke
1724: Walter Waring of Owlbury, Bishops Castle, Salop (Jan–June only)
1724: Methusalen Jones (of Hundredale), Meifod
1725: Thomas Owen of Llynlloedd, Machynlleth
1726: Athelustan Owen, of Rhwsaisan
1727: Richard Price (of Trewyllan), Llansantffraid
1728: Arthur Devereux of Nanteiibba
1729: Richard Mytton of Pontyscowryd
1730: Valentine Hughs of Parke
1731: John Lloyd of Trowscoed
1731: Richard Jones (of Trelludan), Guilsfield
1732: Roger Trevor of Bodenfull
1733: Roger Mostyn of Aberhrriech
1734: Edward Price (of Gunley), Forden
1735: Thomas Browne of Mellington Hall, Churchstoke
1735: Edward Glynn (of Glynn), Glyn Clywedog, Llanidloes
1737: Edward Rogers of Burgeddin
1738: Morgan Edwards of Mellyn-y-greg
1739: John Thomas (of Aston), Churchstoke
1740: Thomas Foulkes of Penthryn
1740: Edward Price, of Bodfach, Llanfyllin
1740: Corbet Owen, Rhiwsaeson, Llanbrynmair
1741: Rees Lloyd, of Cochfaen, Llangurig
1742: Henry Thomas, of Llechwedd-y-Garth, Penant Melangell
1743: Rees Lloyd of Clochfaen
1744: Thomas Foulkes of Penthryn
1745: Gabriel Wynne of Dolarthen
1746: Thomas Edward of Pentry
1747: George Robinson of Birthdire
1747: William Mostyn, of Bryngwyn, Llanfechain
1748: Sir John Price of Newtown
1749: Thomas Lloyd of Trefnant
1750: Bagot Read
1751:
1752: Thomas Lloyd of Dongay, Llandrinio
1753: William Powell of Poole (Welshpool)
1754: William Humphreys of Lluyn
1755: Jenkin Lloyd of Cloch faen
1756: Richard Powell of Poole (Welshpool)
1757: Jenkin Lloyd (or Parry) of Myvod
1758: John Lloyd, of Trowesooed
1759: George Mears (of Fynnant), Llandinam
1760: Richard Owen (of Garth), Llanidloes
1761: Richard Pryce of Gunley
1762: Roger Wynne (of Trevedrid), Meifod
1763: Pryce Davies (of Maesmawr), Llandinam
1764: Arthur Blayney of Gregynog, Tregynon
1765: Arthur Ambler, of Buttington
1766: Owen Owen of Tynycoed, Berriew
1767: William Pugh (of Kilthrew), Kerry
1768: Thomas Thomas (of Garthgelynenfaur), Penant Melangell
1769: Henry Wynne, of Dolarddyn, Castle Caereinion
1770: John Baxter (of The Rocke), Llanllwchaiarn
1771: John Lloyd, of Talwrn, Llanfyllin
1772: Matthew Jones, of Cyfronydd, Castle Caereinion
1773: William Wynne (of Abberfrydlan), Llanwrin
1774: Edward Lloyd (of Berth Lywd), Llanidloes
1775: Clopton Prys, of Llandrinio
1776: Arthur Blayney
1776: Thomas Proctor, of Aberhavesp
1777: Sir John Dashwood-King, 3rd Baronet
1778: Henry Shales, of Carno
1779: Robert Corbett, of Leighton Hall
1780: Robert Howell Vaughan (of Ystim Colwyn), Meifod
1781: Hugh Mears (of Finnant), Llandinam
1782: Henry Tracy (of Maesmawr), Llandinam
1783: William Humphreys, of Llwyn, Llanfyllin
1784: Bell Lloyd (of Bodfach), Llanfyllin
1785: Samule Yates, of Llanbrynmair ? also of Welshpool
1786: Richard Rocke (of Trefnanney), Meifod
1787: Trevor Lloyd, of Glanhafon, Pennant Melangell
1788: Robert John Harrison of Cefngwernfa, Berriew
1789: Francis Lloyd, of Domgay, Llandrinio
1790: Maurice Stephens, of Berth Ddu, Llandinam
1791: John Moxon of Vaynor, Berriew
1792: Robert Clifton (of Aberbechan), Llanllwchaiarn
1793: Thomas Powell, of Llanbrimnair selected but replaced by David Pugh, of Brynderwen
1794: John James, of Castle Caereinion
1795: Lawton Powell, Welshpool
1796: John Dickin , Welshpool
1797: Robert Knight, Gwernygoe
1798: Jukes Granville Clifton Jukes (of Trelydan Hall), Guilsfield
1798: Ralph Leake, of Criggion selected but replaced by William Wheeler Bowen, of Llamlinam
1799: John Palmer Chichester (of Gyngorogfawr), Welshpool

19th century

5 February 1800: Charles Hanbury Tracey, of Gregynog
12 February 1800: Henry Procter, of Aberhaves
11 February 1801: Joseph Lyon, of Vaynor Park, Berriew
3 February 1802: David Edward Lewis Lloyd, of Farm
17 February 1802: Pryce Jones, of Cyfronydd
10 March 1802: Thomas Jones, of Llanlothian
3 February 1803: Robert Knight, of Gwernygoe
10 February 1803: John Winder, of Vaynor
1 February 1804: Charles Hanbury Tracy, of Gregynog
6 February 1805: William Owen, of Bryngwyn
7 March 1805: Bagot Read, of Penyrhillan
1 February 1806: William Owen, of Bryngwyn
4 February 1807: David Edward Lewis Lloyd, of Moydog
3 February 1808: Robert Knight, of Gwernygoe
2 March 1808: Francis Lloyd, of Domgay
6 February 1809: Robert Knight, of Gwernygoe
15 February 1809: Thomas Edwards, of Trefuant
15 March 1809: John Mytten, of Penylan
31 January 1810: Edward Heyward, of Crosswood
21 February 1810: John Owen Herbert, of Dolforgan
8 February 1811: Edward Heyward, of Crosswood
24 January 1812: George Meares, of Fynnant
10 February 1813: Ralph Lecke, of Criggion
20 February 1813: Edward Corbett, of Plas Gwyn
4 March 1813: William Pugh, of Car Howell
4 February 1814: Arthur Davis Owen, of Glansevern 
13 February 1815: Pryce Jones, of Cyfronydd
1816: Thomas Watkin Youde, of Cloghfan replaced by John Arthur Lloyd, of Domgay
1817: Richard Pryce of Gunley
1818: John Edwards (of Machynlleth), Y Plas
1819: John Davies of Machynlleth, owner of the Aberllefenni estate and slate quarries
1820: John Buckely Williames (of Glanhafran), Betws
1821: Valentine Vickers, Criggion
1822: Joseph Hayes Lyon of Cefnblwarch, Berriew
1823: David Pugh MP (of Llanerchydol), Welshpool
1824: Samuel-Amy Severne (of Rhosrgoch), Middletown
1825: Phillip Morris (of Trehelig), Welshpool
1826: John Hunter (of Glynhafren), Llanidloes
1827: John Jones (of Maesmawr), Guilsfield
1828: John James Turner (of Pentreheilin), Llandysilio
1829: Wythen Jones of Rhiewport
1830: Henry Adolphus Proctor, of Aberhafesp Hall
1831: Robert Maurice Bonnor Maurice, of Bodynfoel Hall
1832: Rear Admiral Sir Charles Thomas Jones, of Broadway (1778–1853)
1833: John Jones, of Deythur
1834: William Morris, of Pentre Nant
1835: Hugh Davies Griffiths, of Llechweddgarth
1836: James Proud Johnson, of Monksfields
1837: Robert Phillips, of Hiros
1838: Martin Williams, of Brongwyn
1839: David Hamer, of Glanrafor
1840: Thomas Evans, of Maenol
1841: John Vaughan, of Rhôs Brynbwa
1842: Sir John Roger Kynaston, 3rd Baronet, of Hardwick Hall, Salop
1843: Sir John Conroy, 1st Baronet of Plasypennant
1844: John Dorset Owen (of Broadway), Churchstoke
1845: John Winder Lyon Winder, of Vaynor-Park
1846: John Foulkes, of Carno
1847: Captain Offley Malcolm Crewe Read, R.N., of Llandinam Hall.
1848: William Lutener, of Dolerw
1849: Robert Gardner, of Plas y Court
1850: John Davies Corrie, of Dysserth
1851: Charles Jones, of Garthmill
1852: Edward Salisbury Rose Trevor, of Trowscoed
1853: John Naylor, of Leighton-Hall
1854: John Edmund Severne, of Wallop
1855: Edmund Ethelstone Peel, of Llandrinio
1856: Richard Herbert Mytton, of Garth
1857: Maurice Jones, of Fronfraith
1858: Richard Penruddocke Long, of Dolforgan
1859: Edward Morris, of Berth Lloyd
1860: William Curling, of Maesmawr
1861: John Heyward Heyward, of Crosswood
1862: John Lomax, of Bodfach
1863: John Dugdale, of Llwyn
1864: Major-General William George Gold, of Garthmyl Hall
1865: Robert Simcocks Perrott, of Bronhyddon
1866: Edwin Hilton, of Rhiewhiriarth
1867: Major Joseph Davies, of Brynglas
1868: William Fisher, of Maesfron
1869: John Pryce Davies, of Fronfeleu,
1870: Captain Offley Malcolm Crewe Read, R.N., of Llandinam Hall.
1871: John Robinson Jones, of Brithdir Hall
1872: Henry Bertie Watkin Williams Wynn, of Plas-nant-y-Meichiad
1873: Devereux Herbert Mytton, of Garth
1874: Thomas Openshaw Lomax, of Bodfach
1875: Richard Edward Jones, of Cefn Bryntalch
1876: Richard John Edmunds, of Edderton
1877: James Walton, of Dolforgan
1878: Richard Woosnam, Glandwr, Llanidloes
1879: Colonel George Edward Herbert, of Glanhafren
1880: Robert John Harrison, of Caerhowel
1881: Sir Thomas Gibbons Frost, of Dolcorsllwyn
1882: Nicholas Watson Fairies-Humphreys, of Montgomery
1883: Henry Lloyd, of Dolobran
1884: Philip Wright, of Mellington
1885: Valentine Whitby Vickers, Criggion
1886: Peter Arthur Beck, Trelydan, Guilsfield
1887: Charles Whitley Owen, Fronfraith, Llanyssil
1888: Major William Corbett Winder, of Vaynor Park
1889: Henry Leslie, of Bryntanat
1890: Qeorge Henry Hayhurst Hayhurst-France, of Ystymcolwyn
1891: Sir Pryce Pryce-Jones, of Dolerw, Knight
1892: Edward Davies, of Plas Dinam
1893: John Cooke Hilton, of Glynhiriaeth, Llanfair
1894: Edward Arthur Bonnor Maurice, of Bodynfoel
1895: Athelstane Robert Pryce, of Cyfronydd
1896: John Marshall Dugdale, of Llwyn
1897: John Lomax, of Bodfach
1898: Strafford Davies Price-Davies, Marrington, Chirbury
1899: Oliver Ormrod Openshaw, of Brongain, Llanfechain, Oswestry

20th century

1900: Captain Peter Audley David Arthur Lovell, of Llanerchydol
1901: Arthur Watkin Williams-Wynn, of Coed-y-Maen, Meifod
1902: Hugh Lewis, Glanhafren, Penstrowed
1903: John Naylor, Leighton Hall, Leighton
1904: Edward Arthur Field Whittel Herbert, of Upper Helmsley Hall, York, Esq.
1905: Daniel Wintringham Stable, Plas Llwyn Owen, Llanbrynmair
1906: Sydney Rankin Heap, Mellington, Churchstoke
1907: Hugh Edmund Ethelston Peel, Llandrinio Hall
1908: Arthur Erskin Owen Humphreys-Owen, Glansevern, Berriew
1909: Noel Price James Turner, of Sylfaen Hall, Welshpool,Esq.
1910: Lord Herbert Lionel Vane-Tempest, Y Plas, Machynlleth
1911: Edward Jones, Maesmawr, Llandinam
1912: William Henry Burton Swift, of Crescent House,Newtown, Esq.
1913: William John Corbett-Winder of Vaynor, Berriew
1914: John Murray Naylor, Leighton
1915: Reuben Norton
1916: Major Hugh Edward Bonsall
1917: John Bancroft Willans, Dolforgan, Kerry
1918: Reginald Quayle Wilson, Brooklands, Welshpool
1919: Major General Arthur Edmund Sandbach, Bryngwyn, Llanfechain
1920: Major Harmood Harmood-Banner, Caerhowel, Montgomery
1921: Samuel Arthur Sampson, Dysserth, Welshpool
1922: William Henry Perry Leslie, Bryntanat, Llansantffraid
1923: Pryce Edward Pryce-Jones
1924: Robert Carey Chapple Gill, Blwchycibau
1925: Herbert Arthur Openshaw, of Brongain, Llanfechain
1926: Donald Walter Macpherson, Kerry
1927: William Marsahll Dugdale, Llanfyllin
1928: Henry Platt Hall, Llanymynech
1929: Arthur Lloyd Owen Owen, Machynlleth
1930: Francis Reynolds Verdon, Welshpool
1931: Hector Carlisle Pilkington, Bryn Tanat, Llansantffraid
1932: Lord Davies of Llandinam
1933: Humphrey Dod Lynes, Castle Caereinion
1934: Dr.  Alfred Shearer, Newtown
1935: Dr.  William Henry Lewis, Llansantffraid
1936: Arthur Loftus Onslow, Llanidloes
1937: Major William John Burdon Evans, Newtown
1938: John Howell Evans, London and Pont Dolanog
1939: Evan Emrys Jones, Caersws
1940: John Davies Knatchbull Lloyd, Montgomery
1941: Charles Gerald Trevor, Kt., Guilsfield
1942: Henry Morgan, Burnham, Bucks and Newtown
1943: Christine Stella Way of Berriew
1944: Col. Charles Stafford Price-Davies, Marrington, Chirbury
1945: Thomas Evan Kinsey, Caersws
1946: Marguerite Frances Hanmer, Llanbrynmair
1947: Jano Clement Davies, Meifod
1948: Edward William Minton-Beddoes, Church Stretton, Salop and Dolfor
1949: George Frederick Hamer, Kt.,  Llanidloes
1950: Major Robert John Brymer-Griffith, of Bryneira, Newtown, Montgomeryshire.
1951: The Hon. William Rupert Davies, of Brookland Hall, Welshpool, Montgomeryshire.
1952: Dr. Richard Davies-Jones, of Llys Hafren, Llanidloes.
1953: Robert William Griffiths, of Woodlands, Forden, near Welshpool
1954: Thomas Williams, Forden
1955: Major William Mason Marriott, C.B.E., of Park House, Powis Castle Park, Welshpool.
1956: Captain Edward Calcott Pryce, Guilsfield
1957: Hywel Wynn Oiwen, Esq., of The Moorings, Welshpool
1957: Ralph Edward Blackett Beaumont
1958: Lady Sybil Dorothy Vaughan Hamer (née Owen)
1959: Major John Eldon Marshall Dugdale, T.O., of The Forest, Kerry, Newtown
1960: Lady Lucie Haden Stable, Llanbrynmair
1961: Prof.  David Vaughan Davies, Llanidloes and London
1962: Major Hugh Peter Meredith Lewis, T.D., of Milford Hall, Newtown.
1963: Charles Lionel Joce Humphreys, of Brithdir Hall, Berriew.
1964: David Philip Davies, of Stalloe, Montgomery
1965: John Edfryn Jones, of Henblas, Caersws.
1966: Mrs Joyce Daphne Howard, of Maes From, Trewern.
1967: Dr. Nicholas Bennett-Jones, of Plas-y-Coed, Newtown
1968: Alun Meurig Jones, of Court Calmore, Montgomery.
1969: The Hon. Edward David Grant Davies, of Cefngwyfed, Tregynon.
1970: John Grahame Kynaston Williams, of Trawscoed Hall, Guilsfield.
1971: Cecil Edward Vaughan Owen, of Glasgoed, Llanidloes.
1972: Stephen Williams, of Black Hall, Newtown.
1973: Ion Fitzgibbon Trant, of Maesmawr Hall, Welshpool.
1974 onwards – See High Sheriff of Powys

See also
High Sheriff of Powys

References
 Sheriffs:Montgomery

 
Montgomeryshire
Montgomeryshire
1541 establishments in England